A prophage is a bacteriophage (often shortened to "phage") genome that is integrated into the circular bacterial chromosome or exists as an extrachromosomal plasmid within the bacterial cell. Integration of prophages into the bacterial host is the characteristic step of the lysogenic cycle of temperate phages. Prophages remain latent in the genome through multiple cell divisions until activation by an external factor, such as UV light, leading to production of new phage particles that will lyse the cell and spread. As ubiquitous mobile genetic elements, prophages play important roles in bacterial genetics and evolution, such as in the acquisition of virulence factors.

Background 
Prophages are able to do a multitude of things within their respective bacterial strains. Prophages can increase the virulence potential of bacterial strains in both humans and plant pathogens as well as increase the ability of the bacteria to survive in harsh environments. Pathogens have been able to adapt and thrive in a wide range of environments. Some anaerobic pathogens such as Clostridium perfringens and Clostridium difficile exist in the intestines and are unable to survive in places with large amounts of oxygen for extended periods of time. Still others can reside in the soil such as B. anthracis, while pathogens such as C. difficile can even survive in very sterile hospital settings. Prophages can provide these bacteria with both resistance mechanisms as well as metabolic advantages which give the host cell the best chance of survival,. sometimes even completely altering the bacterial genome.

Prophage induction 
Upon detection of host cell damage by UV light or certain chemicals, the prophage is excised from the bacterial chromosome in a process called prophage induction. After induction, viral replication begins via the lytic cycle. In the lytic cycle, the virus commandeers the cell's reproductive machinery. The cell may fill with new viruses until it lyses or bursts, or it may release the new viruses one at a time in an exocytotic process. The period from infection to lysis is termed the latent period. A virus following a lytic cycle is called a virulent virus. Prophages are important agents of horizontal gene transfer, and are considered part of the mobilome. All families of bacterial viruses that have circular (single-stranded or double-stranded) DNA genomes or replicate their genomes through rolling circle replication (e.g., Caudovirales) have temperate members.

Zygotic induction

Zygotic induction occurs when a bacterial cell carrying the DNA of a bacterial virus transfers its own DNA along with the viral DNA (prophage) into the new host cell. This has the effect of causing the host cell to break apart. The DNA of the bacterial cell is silenced before entry into the cell by a repressor protein which is encoded for by the prophage. Upon the transfer of the bacterial cell's DNA into the host cell, the repressor protein is no longer encoded for, and the bacterial cell's original DNA is then turned on in the host cell. This mechanism eventually will lead to the release of the virus as the host cell splits open and the viral DNA is able to spread. This new discovery provided key insights into bacterial conjugation and contributed to the early repression model of gene regulation, which provided an explanation as to how the lac operon and λ bacteriophage genes are negatively regulated.

Prophage reactivation

Bacteriophage λ is able to undergo a type of recombinational repair called prophage reactivation.  Prophage reactivation can occur by recombination between a UV-damaged infecting phage λ chromosome and a homologous phage genome integrated into the bacterial DNA and existing in a prophage state.  Prophage reactivation in the case of phage λ appears to be an accurate recombinational repair process that is mediated by the recA+ and red+ gene products.

Applications 
Prophages can tell researchers a lot about the relationship between a bacterium and a host. With data from more nonpathogenic bacteria, researchers will be able to gather evidence as to whether or not prophages contribute to the survival value of the host. Prophage genomics has the potential to lead to ecological adaptations of the relationships between bacteria. Another important area of interest is the control of prophage gene expression with many of the lysogenic conversion genes (gene conversion) being tightly regulated. This process is capable of converting non-pathogenic bacteria into pathogenic bacteria that can now produce harmful toxins such as in staph infections. Since the specific mechanisms of prophage are not yet detailed, this research could provide the community with this tool for future research.

Economic impact
Exotoxins encoded by prophages cause pathogenic outcomes in agriculture and aquaculture.

References

See also

 Provirus

Virology
Bacteriophages
Mobile genetic elements
Bacteriology
Bacterial genetics